A.G. West Black Hills High School is a secondary school in Tumwater, Washington serving grades 9–12 in Thurston County. A part of the Tumwater School District, BHHS serves approximately 1000 students each year. It is situated on 41 acres, and includes a 188,000 square foot building with parking and athletic fields to support high school and community programs. The Black Hills High School staff is composed of 3 Administrators, 52 teachers, 3 counselors, 8 Educational Assistants, and 25 Support Staff.

History

A.G. West Black Hills High School opened in the fall of 1997. The school was named after Arthur Garret West (1886–1979) because of his commitment and interest in good schools, roads, and community improvement, and the Black Hills, which dominate the skyline to the west. BHHS's colors are scarlet and Navy. The mascot is the wolf, and is named Rufio. Due to the schools location in proximity to a manure processing plant, the school has earned the affectionate nickname "Cow Pie High" in the community.

Athletics

Black Hills is a member of the Evergreen Conference, a 2A league of the Washington Interscholastic Activities Association.

State Championships, 2nd place:

Girls Basketball - 1999; Girls Golf - 2001

Rifle Team- 1st Place Nationals, 3rd Place Nationals- 2009–2010, 2010-2011 respectively

Extracurriculars 
Black Hills High School features a number of extracurricular options, including marching band, National Honor Society, Gender Sexuality Alliance, DECA, drama, yearbook, and rifle team.

References

External links
 

High schools in Thurston County, Washington
Public high schools in Washington (state)
Educational institutions established in 1997
1997 establishments in Washington (state)